Davide Totaro (born 12 September 1978), known professionally as Set Teitan or Sethlans Teitan, is an Italian guitarist based in Sweden. He was the guitarist of industrial black metal band Aborym from 1997 to 2005, lead guitarist for Bloodline from 2000 to 2005, as well as the second guitarist of the Swedish black/melodic death metal band Dissection. From 2005 to 2018, he performed as lead guitarist for Watain, but in 2018, he stepped away from the band after a photograph surfaced of him giving the Nazi salute. He has also performed on Arckanum's albums Antikosmos and ÞÞÞÞÞÞÞÞÞÞÞ.

References 

Black metal musicians
Living people
1978 births
Italian emigrants to Sweden
Italian guitarists
Italian male guitarists
Death metal musicians
21st-century guitarists
21st-century Italian male musicians
Aborym members
Dissection (band) members
Watain